Bienville Parish is a parish located in the northwestern portion of the U.S. state of Louisiana. At the 2020 census, the population was  12,981. The parish seat is Arcadia.

The highest natural point in Louisiana, a hill known as Mt. Driskill,  in elevation, is located in north central Bienville Parish. The mountain is located on private land with public access by walking trail. It is named for James Christopher Driskill, a 19th-century landowner.

History

In the 1830s, Ruben Drake moved his family from South Carolina to what he named Mount Lebanon, the first permanent settlement in the parish.  As the Drakes were devout Baptists, they established a church and school, which evolved into Mount Lebanon University, the forerunner of Louisiana Christian University in Pineville in Rapides Parish in Central Louisiana. Bonnie and Clyde were shot dead in Bienville Parish on May 23, 1934.

Geography 
The highest natural point in Louisiana, Driskill Mountain (535 ft), is located in Bienville Parish.

Major highways

Interstates
 Interstate 20
 U.S. Highway 80
 U.S. Highway 371
 Louisiana Highway 4
 Louisiana Highway 9

 Claiborne Parish  (north)
 Lincoln Parish  (northeast)
 Jackson Parish  (east)
 Winn Parish  (southeast)
 Natchitoches Parish  (south)
 Red River Parish  (southwest)
 Bossier Parish  (west)
 Webster Parish  (northwest)

Communities

Towns
Arcadia (parish seat and largest municipality)
Gibsland
Mount Lebanon
Ringgold

Villages 
Bienville
Bryceland
Castor
Jamestown
Lucky
Saline

Unincorporated communities 
Brown
Fryeburg
Pine Grove
Pleasant Hill
Roy
Sparta
Taylor

Demographics

As of the 2020 United States census, there were 12,981 people, 5,812 households, and 3,586 families residing in the parish. At the census of 2000, there were 15,752 people, 6,108 households, and 4,214 families residing in the parish. The population density was 19 people per square mile (8/km2). There were 7,830 housing units at an average density of 10 per square mile (4/km2).

In 2000, the racial makeup of the parish was 54.92% White, 43.78% Black or African American, 0.27% Native American, 0.15% Asian, 0.32% from other races, and 0.55% from two or more races.  0.95% of the population were Hispanic or Latino of any race. At the 2020 census, the racial makeup was 53.16% non-Hispanic white, 40.62% Black or African American, 0.47% Native American, 0.16% Asian, 0.04% Pacific Islander, 3.92% multiracial, and 1.63% Hispanic or Latino of any race.

At the 2000 census, were 6,108 households, out of which 31.00% had children under the age of 18 living with them, 46.70% were married couples living together, 17.70% had a female householder with no husband present, and 31.00% were non-families. 28.80% of all households were made up of individuals, and 14.10% had someone living alone who was 65 years of age or older.  The average household size was 2.52 and the average family size was 3.09.

A tabulated 27.30% of the population were under the age of 18, 8.00% were 18 to 24, 24.60% were 25 to 44, 22.50% were 45 to 64, and 17.60% were 65 years of age or older.  The median age was 38 years. For every 100 females there were 91.20 males.  For every 100 females age 18 and over, there were 85.80 males. The median income for a household in the parish was $23,663, and the median income for a family was $30,241. Males had a median income of $28,022 versus $18,682 for females. The per capita income for the parish was $12,471. About 21.80% of families and 26.10% of the population were below the poverty line, including 34.00% of those under age 18 and 23.20% of those age 65 or over.

Politics

Education
The Bienville Parish School Board operates area public schools.

Notable people

 Henry Newton Brown Jr., judge of the Louisiana Second Circuit Court of Appeals (1992-2012) and district attorney of Bossier and Webster parishes (1976-1991), was born in Bienville Parish in 1941.
 Dee Brown, author of Bury My Heart at Wounded Knee, born in Alberta. 
 Bill DeMott, a professional wrestler, maintains a house in Bienville Parish.
 Caroline Dormon (1888–1971), a Louisiana botanist and preservationist, grew up in Bienville Parish.
 Jamie Fair, member of the Louisiana House of Representatives from 1980 to 1984
 Charlie Hennigan, American Football League player from the 1960s
 Henderson Jordan (1896–1958), sheriff of Bienville Parish, 1932–1940; participated in the ambush and killing of Bonnie and Clyde on May 23, 1934; interred at Arcadia Cemetery
 Billy McCormack (1928-2012), Baptist pastor from Shreveport, director and vice president of the Christian Coalition of America, was born in Bienville Parish and is interred at Ringgold.
 Garnie W. McGinty (1900–1984), Louisiana historian
 Danny Roy Moore (1925–c. 2020), represented Claiborne and Bienville parishes in the Louisiana Senate from 1964 to 1968; resided in Arcadia
 Prentiss Oakley (1905–1957), one of six law-enforcement officials involved in the ambush and killing of Bonnie and Clyde; sheriff, 1940–1952
 W. C. Robinson, mathematics professor and second president of Louisiana Tech for the 1899 to 1900 academic year; Robinson Hall on campus is named in his honor; from the Mount Lebanon community.
 Lee Smith, pitcher
 Sam Smith (1922-1995), Member of the Washington House of Representatives was born in Gibsland.
 Jesse N. Stone, president of the Southern University System from 1974 to 1985; civil rights activist
 Marshall H. Twitchell, Reconstruction era state senator who helped to establish Coushatta, the seat of neighboring Red River Parish
 Rush Wimberly, former member of both houses of the Louisiana legislature, lawyer in Arcadia and Shreveport

See also 
 National Register of Historic Places listings in Bienville Parish, Louisiana

References

External links 
 Official webpage for Bienville Parish

 
Louisiana parishes
1848 establishments in Louisiana
Populated places established in 1848